Murad Memon Goth, Memon Goth or Murad Memon is a neighbourhood in the Malir district of Karachi, Pakistan, that previously was a part of Gadap Town until 2011. The estimated population of Memon Goth in 2019 was 75,000. 

Memon Goth has the highest number of educational institutions around Gadap Town. The neighbourhood is located in agricultural lands of Gadap Town.

See also 
 Government Degree College Memon Goth

References

External links 
 Karachi Website
 Wadera Bashir Ahmed Memon (WBAM) Memorial Library, Computer Training & Language Center
 Nexus Schooling System (Memon Goth Campus)

Neighbourhoods of Karachi
Gadap Town